Hylettus hiekei is a species of longhorn beetle of the subfamily Lamiinae. It was described by Ernst Fuchs in 1970 and is known from Ecuador and Colombia.

References

Beetles described in 1970
Beetles of South America
Hylettus